Natalie Saleeba (born 27 June 1978, in Perth) is an Australian actress of a Lebanese descent.

Television
Saleeba is best known for her roles as Jessica Singleton in the medical drama series All Saints, Rosetta Cammeniti on Neighbours and more recently, Abi on House Husbands.

Early life
Saleeba is a trained actress, beginning her career in the early 2000s touring with the Bell Shakespeare Company as well as guest appearances on Always Greener, Stingers, and The Secret Life of Us. Saleeba's first lead role was as Debs in the British Foxtel co-production Lovebytes . Other early credits include Corridors of Power, Head Start and the feature film Under the Lighthouse Dancing.

Roles
Saleeba played the regular role of Nurse Jessica Singelton on All Saints from 2004 to 2006 before moving on to Neighbours, playing Rosetta Cammeniti, the sister of Carmella. She made her on-screen debut on 12 October 2006 and remained with the series for 18 months.

From 2012 to 2017, Saleeba starred as Abi on the Logie winning comedy drama series, House Husbands

Filmography

Film

Television

References

External links

Profile at AustralianTelevision.net

1978 births
Living people
Australian soap opera actresses
Australian people of Lebanese descent